Vincent Hayes Gaddis (December 28, 1913 – February 26, 1997) was an American author who invented the phrase "Bermuda Triangle", which he used first in the cover article for the 1964 February issue of the magazine Argosy. He popularized many stories about anomalous and paranormal phenomena in a style similar to that of Charles Fort.

Career

Gaddis was born in Ohio to Tilden H. and Alice M. (Smith) Gaddis.  He married Margaret Paine Rea on July 14, 1947.  Gaddis worked as a newspaper reporter and writer-editor for a Warsaw, Indiana, radio station from 1947 to 1952.  He was a feature writer for the Elkhart Truth, a daily newspaper in Elkhart, Indiana, from 1952 to 1959.  He then worked as a public relations writer for Studebaker-Packard Corporation and Mercedes Benz Sales in South Bend, Indiana.  In 1962 he became a freelance writer.  He died in Eureka, California.

Reception

Gaddis' statements on the Bermuda Triangle and spontaneous human combustion have been criticized by skeptics for being inaccurate and misleading. Gaddis has also drawn strong criticism for ignoring possible natural explanations and inventing mysteries where none exist.

Historian William K. Powers from Livingston College, Rutgers University has described Gaddis' American Indian Myths and Mysteries as an "outrageous and intolerable book" filled with crackpot claims and "Danikenesque delusions".

Published works
 Winona Lake: A Memory and A Vision, 1949
 Invisible Horizons: True Mysteries of the Sea, 1965
 Mysterious Fires and Lights, 1967 
 Wide World of Magic, 1967
 Strange World of Animals and Pets, 1970
 The Curious World of Twins, 1972
 Courage in Crisis: Dramatic Tales of Heroism in the Face of Danger, 1973
 American Indian Myths and Mysteries, 1977, 
 Gold Rush Ghosts, 1990,

See also
 Philadelphia Experiment
 Crawfordsville monster
 Raifuku Maru

References

External links
 "Electrical Ghosts," article by Gaddis in Borderland Sciences Journal, 1988
 "The Art of Honest Deception," article by Gaddis in Strange Magazine
 Gaddis family tree
 Fiction Mags Index, list of stories by Gaddis

1913 births
1997 deaths
20th-century American non-fiction writers
American fortean writers
Ancient astronauts proponents
Bermuda Triangle
Parapsychologists
People from Eureka, California
Pseudohistorians